Curt Werner Bondy (born 3 April 1894 Hamburg, Germany – 17 January 1972) was a German psychologist and social educator.

Literary works 
 Pädagogische Problem im Jugendstrafvollzug, 1925
 Problems of Internment Camps, Journal of Abnormal and Social Psychology, 1943.
 Bindungslose Jugend, 1952

External links
 https://web.archive.org/web/20060520111218/http://www.uua.org/re/faithworks/fall03/curriculumandlearningresourcese.html (English)
 https://web.archive.org/web/20060519021025/http://www.uua.org/re/faithworks/fall03/fall03.pdf
 https://web.archive.org/web/20061129101032/http://www1.uni-hamburg.de/psycholo/psychneu/seiten/info/geschichte.htm (German)

German psychologists
1894 births
1972 deaths
20th-century psychologists